Triplarina nowraensis, commonly known as Nowra myrtle heath, is a species of flowering plant in the myrtle family, Myrtaceae and is endemic to a restricted area of New South Wales. It is a shrub with egg-shaped to lance-shaped leaves with the narrower end towards the base, flowers with five sepals, five cream-coloured to white petals and fifteen to seventeen stamens.

Description

Taxonomy and naming
Triplarina nowraensis was first formally described by Anthony Bean in 1995 and the description was published in the journal Austrobaileya from specimens collected near Flat Rock Dam, Nowra in 1994. The specific epithet (nowraensis) refers to the type location.

Distribution and habitat
This triplarina grows in moist heath near streams or swampy slopes in the Nowra district.

Conservation status
Triplarina nowraensis is classified as "endangered" under the Australian Government Environment Protection and Biodiversity Conservation Act 1999 and the New South Wales Government Biodiversity Conservation Act 2016, and a national recovery plan has been prepared.

References

nowraensis
Flora of New South Wales
Plants described in 1995
Taxa named by Anthony Bean